Berry Avant Edenfield (August 2, 1934 – May 9, 2015) was a United States district judge of the United States District Court for the Southern District of Georgia.

Early years and education
Born in Bulloch County, Georgia, Edenfield received a Bachelor of Business Administration from the University of Georgia in 1956 and a Bachelor of Laws from the University of Georgia School of Law in 1958. He was in the United States Army, Georgia National Guard from 1957 to 1963. He was in private practice in Statesboro, Georgia, from 1958 to 1978.

Legislative

Edenfield was elected to the Georgia State Senate, from Bulloch County, representing the 4th District in 1964. He took office in January 1965, serving with South Georgia State Senator, Jimmy Carter. Edenfield served one term, until January 1967.

Federal judicial service

On September 27, 1978, Edenfield was nominated by President Jimmy Carter to a seat on the United States District Court for the Southern District of Georgia vacated by Judge Alexander Atkinson Lawrence Jr. Edenfield was confirmed by the United States Senate on October 10, 1978, and received his commission on October 11, 1978. He served as Chief Judge from 1990 to 1997, and assumed senior status on August 2, 2006, serving in that status until his death.

Death

Edenfield died May 9, 2015, aged 80, at Candler Hospital in Savannah, Georgia, from metastatic lung cancer.

References

Sources
 

1934 births
2015 deaths
Deaths from cancer in Georgia (U.S. state)
Deaths from lung cancer
People from Bulloch County, Georgia
People from Statesboro, Georgia
Military personnel from Georgia (U.S. state)
Democratic Party Georgia (U.S. state) state senators
Judges of the United States District Court for the Southern District of Georgia
United States district court judges appointed by Jimmy Carter
20th-century American judges
United States Army soldiers
University of Georgia alumni
University of Georgia School of Law alumni
Georgia National Guard personnel